Jean-Paul Cyr (born December 8, 1965 in Milton, Vermont, United States) is an American racing driver. He competes in the American Canadian Tour.

Seven times Champion of the ACT Tour in 1994, 1996, 2003, 2004, 2005, 2006 and 2007. He won 19 races in the ACT Tour.

He competed in NASCAR Whelen Modified Tour from 1998 to 2000, posting a best finish of fifth at Richmond International Raceway in 1999.

References

External links

Living people
1965 births
People from Milton, Vermont
Racing drivers from Vermont
NASCAR drivers